Symmes Township is one of the twelve townships of Hamilton County, Ohio, United States.  The population was 15,642 as of the 2020 census.

Geography
Located in the northeastern corner of the county, the township has been cut into two "islands" due to annexations by surrounding cities.  They have the following borders:

The northern island
Deerfield Township, Warren County – north
Hamilton Township, Warren County – northeast
Loveland – east
Miami Township, Clermont County – southeast
Indian Hill – south
Montgomery – southwest
Sycamore Township – west

The southern island
Miami Township, Clermont County – north and east
Columbia Township – south
Indian Hill – west

Unincorporated communities
The cities of Indian Hill, Loveland, and Montgomery have annexed large portions of Symmes Township, especially Indian Hill.  The following census-designated places (unincorporated communities) are in the township:
Camp Dennison, in the southern part of the township
Loveland Park, in the northeastern corner, extending north into Warren County
Remington, in the southern tip of the northern "island"
Sixteen Mile Stand, in the western portion of the northern "island"

Name
Named for John Cleves Symmes, it is one of two Symmes Townships statewide; the other Symmes Township is located in Lawrence County.

History

Symmes Township is located in what was originally the Symmes Purchase. The township was incorporated by an act of the General Assembly on January 19, 1822. However, its year of establishment is usually given as 1824, as seen in the township's previous logo. In 1853, the Little Miami Railroad was completed, connecting the township to Cincinnati. Symmes Township survived a 1994 attempt to merge with Loveland, as well as efforts the following year to incorporate most of Symmes and Deerfield Townships as the City of Heritage.

In June 1994, dozens of people witnessed what was initially thought to be an advertising balloon, though Hamilton County has no record of a permit for an advertising balloon that day. The orb remained stationary and was circled by local air traffic. It was visible into the night, but by the next morning it was gone.

Parks 
Symmes Township has 10 parks: Symmes Park, Home of the Brave Park, Hopewell Meadows Park, Stonebridge Park, Shore Drive Park, Seven Gables Park, Meade Historic Preserve, Little Miami Scenic Trail, Camp Dennison Nature Trail, and Blong Memorial Park.

Government
The township is governed by a three-member board of trustees, who are elected in November of odd-numbered years to a four-year term beginning on the following January 1.  Two are elected in the year after the presidential election and one is elected in the year before it.  There is also an elected township fiscal officer, who serves a four-year term beginning on April 1 of the year after the election, which is held in November of the year before the presidential election.  Vacancies in the fiscal officership or on the board of trustees are filled by the remaining trustees.

Police and fire protection in Symmes Township are the responsibility of the Hamilton County Sheriff and the Loveland-Symmes Fire Department respectively.

Education
Three different school districts include parts of the township:
The Indian Hill Exempted Village School District serves the southern part of the township.
The Loveland City School District serves the northeastern part of the township
The Sycamore Community School District serves the western part of the township.
Many private schools are located near Symmes Township as well, including Cincinnati Country Day School, Cincinnati Hills Christian Academy, Archbishop Moeller High School, Ursuline Academy, St. Margaret of York Elementary School, and St. Columban School.

The township is also served by a branch of the Public Library of Cincinnati and Hamilton County.

References

External links 
Township website
Loveland-Symmes Fire Department

Townships in Hamilton County, Ohio
Townships in Ohio
1822 establishments in Ohio